The RoboCup Standard Platform League (SPL) is one of several leagues within RoboCup, an international competition with autonomous robotic soccer matches as the main event.

Overview
In the Standard Platform League all teams use identical (i.e., standard) robots, allowing the teams concentrate on software development rather than the mechanics of robots. The robots operate fully autonomously; i.e., there is no remote control by either humans or computers during the games.

The League began as the Sony Four-Legged League in 1999 using the Sony AIBO. Initially a small number of teams were invited to join the league. In 2002, the league was opened and teams were allowed to apply through a qualification process.  After Sony announced that it would discontinue production of the AIBO in 2006, the League searched for a new platform and decided on the Aldebaran Robotics humanoid NAO.  In 2008, the League ran both AIBOs and Naos and was renamed the Standard Platform League.  From 2009, only the Naos were used.

History

Summaries of previous World Championships

Technical Challenges Results

Drop-In Competition Results

League Photos

2014
A group photo of all teams participating in RoboCup SPL 2014

2013
A group photo of all teams participating in RoboCup SPL 2013
Robots on display for the Queen of The Netherlands at RoboCup 2013

2012
A group photo of all teams participating in RoboCup SPL 2012

2011
A group photo of all teams participating in RoboCup SPL 2011

2010
A group photo of all teams participating in RoboCup SPL 2010

2009
A group photo of all teams participating in RoboCup SPL 2009

Founders of the League
 Hiroaki Kitano, RoboCup Federation
 Manuela Veloso, Carnegie Mellon University, USA
 Masahiro Fujita, Sony Corporation, Japan
 Minoru Asada, Osaka University, Japan
 Dominique Duhaut, Université de Bretagne Sud, France

Rules
 RoboCup SPL Rules

Robots
1999–2008 Sony AIBO.

2008–present Aldebaran Robotics humanoid NAO robots.

Technologies 

Control of the robots relies on several areas of robotics, including 
 Adaptive control
 Artificial Intelligence
 Bayesian Learning Learning
 Classification and Clustering
 Computational Neuroscience
 Data Mining Techniques
 Digital Control
 Digital Image Processing
 Dimension reduction
 Evolutionary Computation
 Kalman Filter, Extended Kalman Filter
 Flexible Distribution functions
 Feedback Control and Regulation
 Manifold learning
 Motor Control and Legged Locomotion
 Neural Networks
 Reinforcement Learning
 Robot Programming
 Software Engineering
 Support Vector Machines
 Machine vision

See also 
 Nao (robot)
 AIBO

References

External links

 
 rUNSWift
 Northern Bites
 UT Austin Villa
 Nao-Team HTWK
 Austrian-Kangaroos
NimbRo article, NimbRo website
 CMurfs - Carnegie Mellon University
 Cerberus - Bogazici University
 UTS Unleashed! - University of Technology, Sydney
 WrightEagle Unleashed! - University of Technology, Sydney and University of Science and Technology China
 B-Human
 NUBots
 NaoTH - Humboldt Universität zu Berlin
 Nao Devils - TU Dortmund University
 Bembelbots - Goethe-University Frankfurt
 DAInamite - TU Berlin Germany
 AUTManNAO - Amirkabir University of Technology, Tehran, Iran
 MRL-SPL - Qazvin Islamic Azad University, Qazvin, Iran
 RoboEireann - National University of Ireland, Maynooth
 Dutch Nao Team
 NTUPal Team - National Taiwan University, Taiwan

RoboCup
Sports leagues established in 1999
Robot soccer competitions
Osaka University research